Poems by Melanter is an 1853 collection of poems by English novelist R.D. Blackmore.

Notes

English poetry collections
1854 books